Danilia eucheliformis is a species of sea snail, a marine gastropod mollusk in the family Chilodontidae.

Description
The height of the shell attains 10 mm.

Distribution
THis species occurs in the Western Pacific off Midway Island.

References

 Habe T. & Kosuge S. (1970) Descriptions of three new gastropods from the sea around Midway Island. Venus 29(3): 87-92, pl. 6.
 Vilvens C. & Héros V. 2005. New species and new records of Danilia (Gastropoda: Chilodontidae) from the Western Pacific. Novapex 6(3) : 53–64

External links

eucheliformis
Gastropods described in 1940